Italy competed at the 1983 Summer Universiade in Edmonton, Canada and won 25 medals.

Medals

Details

References

External links
 Universiade (World University Games)
 WORLD STUDENT GAMES (UNIVERSIADE - MEN)
 WORLD STUDENT GAMES (UNIVERSIADE - WOMEN)

1983
1983 Summer Universiade
1983 in Italian sport